Sherlon Greaves (born 26 April 1962) is a Barbadian cricketer. He played in ten first-class and three List A matches for the Barbados cricket team from 1983 to 1994.

See also
 List of Barbadian representative cricketers

References

External links
 

1962 births
Living people
Barbadian cricketers
Barbados cricketers
People from Saint Andrew, Barbados